La Force is French for the Force.

La Force can refer to:

Places
 La Force, Aude,  commune in southern France.
 La Force, Dordogne, commune in southwestern France
 La Force Prison, former prison in Paris

People
 Duc de La Force was a peerage of France
 Jacques-Nompar de Caumont, duc de la Force (1558-1652), marshal of France and peer of France
 Armand-Nompar de Caumont, duc de la Force (c. 1580-1675), first son of Jacques-Nompar, peer and marshal of France
 Charlotte-Rose de Caumont La Force or Mademoiselle de La Force (1654 - 1724), a French writer
 Ariel Engle, a Canadian musician who used the stage name La Force for her debut solo album in 2018

Sports teams
 Los Angeles Force, an American soccer club playing in the National Independent Soccer Association

See also
Laforce, municipality in Quebec, Canada
LaForce, surname